Eric Barrett Winter (born July 17, 1976) is an American actor and former fashion model. He has appeared in the television roles of Rex Brady on the NBC soap opera Days of Our Lives, FBI Special Agent Craig O'Laughlin on the CBS drama series The Mentalist (2010–2012), Dash Gardiner on the Lifetime fantasy-drama series Witches of East End (2013–2014), and Sergeant Tim Bradford on the ABC drama The Rookie. His film appearances include Harold & Kumar Escape from Guantanamo Bay (2008) and The Ugly Truth (2009).

Early life 
Winter was born on July 17, 1976, in La Mirada, California. He graduated from UCLA with a degree in psychology. To pay for college, he began modeling, and his career goal, which was to become a doctor, changed as he decided to pursue acting.

Career

Modeling 
Before his acting roles, Winter was a model and had some high-profile campaigns, such as one print campaign for Tommy Hilfiger. He appeared in a television commercial with Britney Spears for her fragrance, Curious.

Acting 
Winter played the role of Rex Brady on the daytime soap opera Days of Our Lives from July 8, 2002, until July 26, 2005. After leaving Days of Our Lives, he had many small roles in television shows, such as CSI; Love, Inc.; Charmed; and Just Legal. He guest-starred on ABC Family's Wildfire for five episodes. His character, R.J. Blake, a bull-rider who dated the character of Dani Davis (played by Nicole Tubiola), was killed in the episode "Heartless", which aired originally on February 28, 2007. Winter also appeared on The Parkers in the episode "The Boomerang Effect". He appeared in an episode of the CBS series The Ex-List, and in the recurring role of Jason McCallister, the brother of Senator Robert McCallister (Rob Lowe) and love interest of Kevin Walker (Matthew Rhys) on the ABC drama Brothers & Sisters. Winter was a regular on the short-lived CBS series Viva Laughlin and Moonlight. He appears in the feature films Harold & Kumar Escape from Guantanamo Bay (2008) and The Ugly Truth (2009).

In 2010, Winter starred as the character Michael Friend, the imaginary friend of Jane (Alyssa Milano) in the Lifetime television movie Sundays at Tiffany's.

From 2010 to 2012, Winter appeared in the CBS crime drama The Mentalist as FBI agent Craig O'Laughlin, the boyfriend and later fiancé of Amanda Righetti's character Grace Van Pelt. In 2012, he had a recurring role as Luke Lourd on the ABC comedy-drama series GCB. Winter appeared in the video game Beyond: Two Souls.

In 2013, Winter began starring in the Lifetime television series Witches of East End as Dash Gardiner. The series was canceled on November 4, 2014, after two seasons. In October 2018, he began starring in the ABC drama The Rookie as Sergeant Tim Bradford.

Book 
Winter is the co-author with his wife, Roselyn Sánchez, of the children's book Sebi and the Land of Cha Cha Cha, published in 2017. The book was inspired by their daughter, Sebella 'Sebi' Rose Winter.

Personal life 
Winter was married to actress Allison Ford from 2001 until 2005.

He dated actress Roselyn Sánchez for two years prior to their engagement on January 1, 2008, during a holiday vacation on Vieques, an island just east of mainland Puerto Rico. The couple wed on November 29, 2008, at a historic fort in San Juan, Puerto Rico. Sánchez and Winter have two children.

Filmography

References

External links 
 

1976 births
20th-century American male actors
21st-century American male actors
American male film actors
American male soap opera actors
Living people
Male actors from California
People from La Mirada, California
University of California, Los Angeles alumni